Pat Cash and Patrick Rafter were the defending champions, but lost in the quarterfinals this year.

Mark Merklein and Vincent Spadea won the title, defeating Alex O'Brien and Jeff Salzenstein 6–4, 4–6, 6–4 in the final.

Seeds

  Byron Black /  Grant Connell (first round)
  Sandon Stolle /  Cyril Suk (semifinals)
  Scott Davis /  Kelly Jones (first round)
  Tom Kempers /  Tom Nijssen (quarterfinals)

Draw

Draw

External links
Draw

Doubles